This list of laboratory biosecurity incidents includes accidental laboratory-acquired infections and laboratory releases of lethal pathogens, containment failures in or during transport of lethal pathogens, and incidents of exposure of lethal pathogens to laboratory personnel, improper disposal of contaminated waste, and/or the escape of laboratory animals. The list is grouped by the year in which the accident or incident occurred and does not include every reported laboratory-acquired infection.

See also
 Biological hazard
 Biosafety level
 Laboratory safety
 List of anthrax outbreaks
 Select agent
 Cambridge Working Group

External Links
 A Review of Laboratory-Acquired Infections in the Asia-Pacific: Understanding Risk and the Need for Improved Biosafety for Veterinary and Zoonotic Diseases
 Laboratory-Acquired Infection (LAI) Database
 Survey of laboratory-acquired infections around the world in biosafety level 3 and 4 laboratories

References

 
Biosecurity
Biosecurity incidents
Occupational safety and health